Panfilovo is the name of several rural localities in Russia.

Modern localities
Panfilovo, Altai Krai, a selo in Novoromanovsky Selsoviet of Kalmansky District in Altai Krai; 
Panfilovo (selo), Ivanovo Oblast, a selo in Savinsky District of Ivanovo Oblast
Panfilovo (village), Ivanovo Oblast, a village in Savinsky District of Ivanovo Oblast
Panfilovo, Kaliningrad Oblast, a settlement under the administrative jurisdiction of the urban-type settlement of district significance of Zheleznodorozhny in Pravdinsky District of Kaliningrad Oblast
Panfilovo, Kemerovo Oblast, a selo in Chusovitinskaya Rural Territory of Leninsk-Kuznetsky District in Kemerovo Oblast; 
Panfilovo, Galichsky District, Kostroma Oblast, a village in Loparevskoye Settlement of Galichsky District in Kostroma Oblast; 
Panfilovo, Susaninsky District, Kostroma Oblast, a village in Sokirinskoye Settlement of Susaninsky District in Kostroma Oblast; 
Panfilovo, Nizhny Novgorod Oblast, a selo in Shatovsky Selsoviet of Arzamassky District in Nizhny Novgorod Oblast; 
Panfilovo, Velizhsky District, Smolensk Oblast, a village in Budnitskoye Rural Settlement of Velizhsky District in Smolensk Oblast
Panfilovo, Vyazemsky District, Smolensk Oblast, a village in Yushkovskoye Rural Settlement of Vyazemsky District in Smolensk Oblast
Panfilovo, Gus-Khrustalny, Vladimir Oblast, a settlement under the administrative jurisdiction of the Town of Gus-Khrustalny in Vladimir Oblast
Panfilovo, Muromsky District, Vladimir Oblast, a selo in Muromsky District of Vladimir Oblast
Panfilovo, Petushinsky District, Vladimir Oblast, a village in Petushinsky District of Vladimir Oblast
Panfilovo, Sudogodsky District, Vladimir Oblast, a village in Sudogodsky District of Vladimir Oblast
Panfilovo, Volgograd Oblast, a settlement in Panfilovsky Selsoviet of Novoanninsky District in Volgograd Oblast
Panfilovo, Gryazovetsky District, Vologda Oblast, a village in Minkinsky Selsoviet of Gryazovetsky District in Vologda Oblast
Panfilovo, Sheksninsky District, Vologda Oblast, a village in Yurochensky Selsoviet of Sheksninsky District in Vologda Oblast
Panfilovo, Kirillovsky Rural Okrug, Lyubimsky District, Yaroslavl Oblast, a village in Kirillovsky Rural Okrug of Lyubimsky District in Yaroslavl Oblast
Panfilovo, Yermakovsky Rural Okrug, Lyubimsky District, Yaroslavl Oblast, a village in Yermakovsky Rural Okrug of Lyubimsky District in Yaroslavl Oblast
Panfilovo, Poshekhonsky District, Yaroslavl Oblast, a village in Pogorelsky Rural Okrug of Poshekhonsky District in Yaroslavl Oblast
Panfilovo, Rybinsky District, Yaroslavl Oblast, a selo in Oktyabrsky Rural Okrug of Rybinsky District in Yaroslavl Oblast
Panfilovo, Tutayevsky District, Yaroslavl Oblast, a village in Fominsky Rural Okrug of Tutayevsky District in Yaroslavl Oblast

Alternative names
Panfilovo, alternative name of Bolshoye Panfilovo, a village in Gorevsky Selsoviet of Urensky District in Nizhny Novgorod Oblast;